Laelaps  (gen.:  means "hurricane") (Lelaps, Lalaps, Lailaps) was a Greek mythological dog that never failed to catch what it was hunting.

Mythology 
In one version of Laelaps' origin story, it was a gift from Zeus to Europa. The hound was passed down to King Minos, who gave it as a reward to the Athenian princess Procris. In another version of her story, she received the animal as a gift from the goddess Artemis. 

Procris' husband Cephalus decided to use the hound to hunt the Teumessian fox, a fox that could never be caught.  This was a paradox: a dog that always caught its prey versus a fox that could never be caught. The chase went on until Zeus, perplexed by their contradictory fates, turned both to stone and cast them into the stars as the constellations Canis Major (Laelaps) and Canis Minor (the Teumessian fox).

Notes

Greek legendary creatures
Mythological dogs

Reference 

 Apollodorus, The Library with an English Translation by Sir James George Frazer, F.B.A., F.R.S. in 2 Volumes, Cambridge, MA, Harvard University Press; London, William Heinemann Ltd. 1921. ISBN 0-674-99135-4. Online version at the Perseus Digital Library. Greek text available from the same website.

Deeds of Zeus
Metamorphoses into inanimate objects in Greek mythology